Martina Navratilova and Pam Shriver defeated the defending champions Kathy Jordan and Anne Smith in the final, 6–3, 7–6(8–6) to win the ladies' doubles tennis title at the 1981 Wimbledon Championships.

Seeds

  Kathy Jordan /  Anne Smith (final)
  Martina Navratilova /  Pam Shriver (champions)
  Rosie Casals /  Wendy Turnbull (second round)
  Sue Barker /  Ann Kiyomura (semifinals)
  Candy Reynolds /  Paula Smith (third round)
  Barbara Potter /  Sharon Walsh (quarterfinals)
  Rosalyn Fairbank /  Tanya Harford (semifinals)
 n/a
  JoAnne Russell /  Virginia Ruzici (third round)
  Sylvia Hanika /  Andrea Jaeger (third round)
  Chris Evert Lloyd /  Virginia Wade (quarterfinals)
  Mary-Lou Piatek /  Wendy White (third round)

Draw

Finals

Top half

Section 1

Section 2

Bottom half

Section 3

Section 4

References

External links

1981 Wimbledon Championships – Women's draws and results at the International Tennis Federation

Women's Doubles
Wimbledon Championship by year – Women's doubles
Wimbledon Championships
Wimbledon Championships